High Strung may refer to:

 High Strung (1991 film), an American independent comedy film
 High Strung (2016 film), an American drama film
 The High Strung, an American rock band
 Nashville tuning (high strung), a guitar tuning